OVG may refer to:

Oxford Vaccine Group, a vaccine research group within the Department of Paediatrics at the University of Oxford
Oak View Group, an American global advisory, development and investment company for the sports and live entertainment industries

Disambiguation pages